South Cairo is a hamlet (and census-designated place) in Greene County, New York, United States. South Cairo has a post office with ZIP code 12482.

References

Hamlets in Greene County, New York
Hamlets in New York (state)